Sphyrelata amotella is a moth of the family Oecophoridae. It was described by Francis Walker in 1864. It is found in Australia (the Australian Capital Territory, New South Wales and Queensland) and New Zealand.

The larvae damage cork.

References

 Sphyrelata laetifica in uBio

Moths described in 1864
Oecophoridae
Moths of New Zealand
Moths of Australia